Frisco Jenny is a 1932 American pre-Code drama film directed by William A. Wellman and starring Ruth Chatterton and Louis Calhern. Its storyline bears a resemblance to Chatterton's previous hit film, Madame X (1929).

Plot
In 1906 San Francisco, Jenny Sandoval, a denizen of the notorious Tenderloin district, wants to marry piano player Dan McAllister, but her saloonkeeper father Jim is adamantly opposed to it. An earthquake kills both men and devastates the city. In the aftermath, Jenny gives birth to a son, whom she names Dan.

With financial help from crooked lawyer Steve Dutton, who also came from the Tenderloin, she enters the vice trade, providing women on demand. Jenny has one loyal friend, the Chinese woman Amah, who helps take care of the baby.

At a party in Steve's honor, he catches gambler Ed Harris cheating him in a back room. In the ensuing struggle, Steve kills him, with Jenny the only eyewitness. The pair are unable to dispose of the body before it is found, and they are questioned by the police but not charged. The scandal forces Jenny to temporarily surrender her baby to a respectable couple who owe Steve a favor in order to prevent the forcible removal of the child by a children's welfare society with a court order.

After three years, Jenny tries to reclaim her son, but when he clings to the only mother whom he knows, she leaves him with his adoptive parents. Years later, Dan graduates from Stanford University, where he was a football star, and becomes an assistant district attorney. Jenny lovingly follows his progress while taking command of vice and bootlegging in the city.

When Dan runs for district attorney, his opponent is Tom Ford, a man who does Jenny's bidding. Against her best interests, she frames Ford so that Dan can win. When Steve tries to bribe Dan to free some of his men, Steve is arrested. Out on bail, Steve asks Jenny to blackmail Dan into dropping the charges, but she refuses to jeopardize her son's future. When Steve threatens to reveal that Jenny is Dan's real mother, she shoots and kills Steve at Dan's office.

Jenny is quickly arrested and prosecuted by Dan. Refusing to defend herself, she is condemned to death by hanging. Amah pleads with her to tell Dan the truth in the hope that he can help her, but when he comes to see her, she remains silent. Jenny beseeches Amah to never reveal the truth to Dan.

With Jenny now dead, Amah throws Jenny's newspaper clippings following Dan's achievements into the fireplace.

Cast

References

External links

 
 
 
 

1932 drama films
1932 films
American black-and-white films
Films about the 1906 San Francisco earthquake
Films about prostitution in the United States
Films directed by William A. Wellman
Films set in San Francisco
Films set in the 1900s
Films set in the 1910s
Films set in the 1920s
American drama films
Films with screenplays by Robert Lord (screenwriter)
1930s English-language films
1930s American films